Kathleen O'Regan (11 November 1903 – 10 December 1970) was an Irish actress, best-remembered for her performances in the first London performances of Juno and the Paycock and The Plough and the Stars.

Later in her career, she showed her talents in comedy, appearing, on the author's recommendation, in Ben Travers's farce Banana Ridge (1938). She also appeared in films, including Alfred Hitchcock's screen rendering of Juno and the Paycock (1930).

Personal life
She was married to Lt Colonel K.A. Plimpton, DSO, who was secretary of the Garrick Club for 14 years. She died in 1970, aged 67

Filmography

Notes

External links
 Kathleen O'Regan profile, Allmovie.com; accessed 26 October 2015.
 

1903 births
1970 deaths
20th-century Irish actresses
Irish stage actresses
Irish film actresses
Place of birth missing
Place of death missing